Carlos Orleans Brandão Júnior (born June 2, 1958 in Colinas) is a Brazilian politician affiliated to the Brazilian Socialist Party. He is currently the governor of Maranhão, after the resignation of Flávio Dino in April 2, 2022.  He was the Vice Governor of Maranhão between 2015 and 2022, and was reelected in 2018 in Flávio Dino's gubernatorial ticket. Previously, he was a Federal Deputy for Maranhão for two consecutive terms. He holds a degree in Veterinary Medicine at the State University of Maranhão.

References 

Living people
1958 births
Brazilian Democratic Movement politicians
People from Maranhão
Members of the Chamber of Deputies (Brazil) from Maranhão

Republicans (Brazil) politicians
Brazilian Socialist Party politicians
Brazilian Social Democracy Party politicians
Liberal Front Party (Brazil) politicians
Governors of Maranhão